The 64th Rifle Division was an infantry division of the Soviet Union's Red Army which existed between 1942 and 1945.

History 
There was a previous 64th Rifle Division active between July 1925 and 26 September 1941, which it was renamed the 7th Guards Rifle Division.

A new 64th Rifle Division was formed in early 1942, which took part in hostilities from 5 March 1942 to 9 May 1945.

Until June 1942, the division was part of the Moscow Military District. Then it was included in the 8th Reserve Army which became the 66th Army on 27 August 1942. On 16 August, the division was moved to the front and took up defensive positions in the area of ​​the settlement of Spartak, on the northern outskirts of Pichuga with the task of preventing the enemy from moving north along the right bank of the Volga River. 

In stubborn and bloody battles, the division suffered heavy losses, but stopped the enemy's advance. Over the next 4,5 months, its units, as part of the 66th Army of the Don Front, were continuously engaged in active hostilities. Since November, the division participated in the encirclement and defeat of enemy troops at Stalingrad. By the end of the month, it had established itself on the bend in the railway, northeast of the village of Orlovka, where she fought until January 1943. 

After that, she was withdrawn to the reserve of the 66th Army. In total, in the battles near Stalingrad, she destroyed 68 enemy tanks, 4 armored vehicles, 23 vehicles, 46 guns and mortars, 125 heavy machine guns, shot down 4 German aircraft by small arms fire and killed or wounded over 2,500 German soldiers and officers.

From 27 January to 3 February 1943, the division was transferred to the area around Sukhinichi in ​​the Smolensk region, where it was included in the 16th Army and fought on the right bank of the Zhizdra River.From the end of April, she was part of the 50th Army and fought defensive battles in the area of ​​the settlement of Shchigry in the Zhizdrinsky District of the Kaluga Oblast. Then the division marched to the area of ​​the city of Serpeysk, where it became part of the 38th Rifle Corps of the 10th Army and until November fought offensive battles in the Roslavl and Mogilev directions. 

At the end of April 1944, it became subordinate to the 49th Army of the 2nd Belorussian Front and fought defensive battles near the settlements of Ustye and Lapeni in the Kastsyukovichy District of the Mogilev Oblast. At the end of June, during Operation Bagration, as part of the 38th Rifle Corps, the division crossed the Basya, Resta and Rudya rivers, and participated in the liberation of the city of Mogilev on 28 June. For this it received the title "Mogilevskaya". In July, it crossed the Neman River near the town of Belitsa, and in August it took part in the capture of the Osowiec Fortress, for which she was awarded the Order of Suvorov, 2nd degree.

From September 1944 to January 1945, the division was in the reserve and was then added to the 33rd Army of the 1st Belorussian Front and participated in the Vistula-Oder offensive. During the final stages of the war, the division successfully operated in the Battle of Berlin, for which it was awarded the Order of Kutuzov, 2nd degree.

Sources
 the article in the Russian Wikipedia, 64-я стрелковая дивизия (2-го формирования).''

064
Military units and formations disestablished in 1945
Military units and formations established in 1942